Trap is the second studio album of the Belgian rock band Dead Man Ray. It was released in 2000.

Tracks 
Woods (4:36)
Weckpot (1:31)
Toothpaste (4:09)
Brenner (6:02)
Jahwe (1:56)
Dover (1:14)
Ham (3:26)
Nezt (5:44)
Slow Indian (4:01)
Tunnels (4:57)
Warehouse (0:51)
Théque (3:23)
Niecht (2:13)
Tham (2:07)
Preset (6:26)

References

Dead Man Ray albums
2000 albums